Arigomphus maxwelli is a dragonfly in the genus Arigomphus ("pond clubtails"), in the family Gomphidae ("clubtails"). A common name for Arigomphus maxwelli is "bayou clubtail".
Arigomphus maxwelli is found in North America.

The IUCN conservation status of Arigomphus maxwelli is "LC", least concern, with no immediate threat to the species' survival. The population is stable.

References

Further reading
 American Insects: A Handbook of the Insects of America North of Mexico, Ross H. Arnett. 2000. CRC Press.
 Garrison, Rosser W. / Poole, Robert W., and Patricia Gentili, eds. (1997). Odonata. Nomina Insecta Nearctica: A Check List of the Insects of North America, vol. 4: Non-Holometabolous Orders, 551-580.
 Paulson, Dennis R., and Sidney W. Dunkle (1999). A Checklist of North American Odonata including English name, etymology, type locality, and distribution. Slater Museum of Natural History, University of Puget Sound, Occasional Paper no. 56, 88.

External links

Gomphidae
Insects described in 1950